Qurtulmush (Romanized as Qurtulmuš, Qurtulmuş or Qūrtūlmūsh; also known as Gurtulmush, Kurturmish, Qūd Tolmūsh, Qūrtolmesh, Qūrtūrmūsh, and Qūrtūrmesh) is a village in Yurchi-ye Sharqi Rural District of Kuraim District, Nir County, Ardabil province, Iran. At the 2006 census, its population was 702 in 123 households. The following census in 2011 counted 544 people in 137 households. The latest census in 2016 showed a population of 406 people in 99 households; it was the largest village in its rural district.

References 

Nir County

Towns and villages in Nir County

Populated places in Ardabil Province

Populated places in Nir County